Songs for the Gentle Man is a 1971 folk rock album by singer-songwriter Bridget St John. A follow-up to her highly successful debut album, Songs for the Gentle Man propelled her to cult status in the United Kingdom. The album was produced by Ron Geesin, who had worked with Pink Floyd.

Track listing
All tracks composed by Bridget St John; except where indicated
"A Day a Way"
"City-Crazy"
"Early Morning Song"
"Back to Stay" (John Martyn)
"Seagull-Sunday" (Nigel Beresford)
"If You'd Been There"
"Song for the Laird of Connaught Hall – Part 2"
"Making Losing Better"
"The Lady and the Gentle Man"
"Downderry Daze"
"The Pebble and the Man" (Donovan Leitch)
"It Seems Very Strange"
Bonus Tracks on Japanese CD
13. "Fly High" (Single version)
14. "There's a Place I Know"
15. "Suzanne"
16. "Passing Thru'"

Personnel
Jerry Boys - engineer
Baba Kerr - cover
Adrian Lynne, Mitch Walker - photography

1971 albums
Albums produced by Ron Geesin
Dandelion Records albums